Speedpost is a book written in 1999 by Shobha De.

The book is a series of letters to her six children, either grown, or nearly so. The subjects that she approaches through the medium of letters include: growing pains and adolescent anxieties about love, sex and friendship; religion and God; the challenge of being a responsible parent, death, remembrance and family traditions, the place of career, sex and of values in the lives of her children.

References

Speedpost
Novels by Shobhaa De
1999 non-fiction books
20th-century Indian books
Collections of letters